Ulrich Luke Wendon (17 April 1926 – 6 December 2016) was a German born, British fencer. He competed at the 1948 and 1952 Summer Olympics. In 1952, he won the foil title at the British Fencing Championships.

References

1926 births
2016 deaths
British male fencers
Olympic fencers of Great Britain
Fencers at the 1948 Summer Olympics
Fencers at the 1952 Summer Olympics